Bruno Dupire (born 1958) is a researcher and lecturer in quantitative finance. He is currently Head of Quantitative Research at Bloomberg LP. He is best known for his contributions to local volatility modeling and Functional Itô Calculus. He is also an Instructor at New York University since 2005, in the Courant Master of Science Program in Mathematics in Finance.

Early life and education
Dupire is an alumnus of École normale supérieure Paris-Saclay. He received a master's degree in artificial intelligence from the Pierre and Marie Curie University and his Ph.D. in numerical analysis from the Pontifical Catholic University of Rio de Janeiro.

Local volatility
Dupire is best known for showing how to derive a local volatility model consistent with a surface of option prices across strikes and maturities, establishing the so-called Dupire's approach to local volatility for modeling the volatility smile. The Dupire equation is a partial differential equation (PDE) that links the contemporaneous prices of European call options of all strikes and maturities to the instantaneous volatility of the price process, assumed to be a function of price and time only.

Awards
Dupire is the recipient of the Risk magazine "Lifetime Achievement Award" for 2008, and has been voted in 2006 as the most important derivatives practitioner of the previous 5 years in the ICBI  Global Derivatives industry survey. He has also been included in Dec' 02 in the Risk magazine "Hall of Fame" of the 50 most influential people in the history of financial derivatives. In 2006 he was awarded the Cutting Edge research award by Wilmott Magazine

References

Books
 

Papers
 Dupire, B, (January 2004), Pricing with a Smile. Risk Magazine, Incisive Media
 Dupire, B (September 1993),  Model Art , Risk Magazine, Incisive Media
 Dupire, B (August 2009), Functional Itô Calculus, SSRN.
 Dupire, B (2010) Dupire equation, in: R Cont (Ed.): Encyclopedia of Quantitative Finance, Wiley, 2010.

External links
 Dupire's page at Risk Who's Who
 Risk magazine lifetime achievement award

20th-century  American  mathematicians
21st-century  American  mathematicians
Financial economists
Living people
Monte Carlo methodologists
University of Paris alumni
Date of birth missing (living people)
1958 births